The Khmer Republic was the Cambodian state during the United States-backed military dictatorship of Lon Nol from 1970 to 1975. Its establishment was formally declared on 9 October 1970, following the 18 March 1970 coup d'état which saw the overthrow of Norodom Sihanouk's government and the abolishment of the Cambodian monarchy.

The main cause of the coup was Norodom Sihanouk's tolerance of North Vietnamese military activity within Cambodia's borders; Vietnamese communist forces had gained de facto control over vast areas of eastern Cambodia as a result. Another important factor was the dire state of the Cambodian economy, an indirect result of Sihanouk's policies of pursuing neutrality.

With the removal of Sihanouk, the existing Kingdom of Cambodia became a republic, officially removing Sisowath Kossamak. The character of the new regime was far-right and militaristic; most significantly, it ended Sihanouk's period of covert co-operation with the North Vietnamese regime and the Viet Cong, and aligned Cambodia with South Vietnam in the ongoing Second Indochina War. The Khmer Republic was opposed within the Cambodian borders by the National United Front of Kampuchea (Front uni national de Kampuchéa, FUNK), a relatively broad alliance between Sihanouk, his supporters, and the Communist Party of Kampuchea.

The insurgency itself was conducted by the CPNLAF, the Cambodian People's National Liberation Armed Forces: they were backed by both the People's Army of Vietnam (PAVN) and the National Liberation Front (NLF, better known as the Viet Cong), who occupied parts of Cambodia as part of their ongoing war with the South Vietnamese government.

Despite the large quantities of military and financial aid from the United States, its Khmer National Armed Forces (Forces armées nationales khmères, or FANK) was poorly trained and unable to defeat either the CPNLAF or the Vietnamese forces of the PAVN and NLF. The Republic eventually fell on 17 April 1975, when the Khmer Rouge took Phnom Penh and briefly restored the Kingdom of Cambodia before renaming itself Democratic Kampuchea on 5 January 1976.

Political history

Coup 

 
Sihanouk himself claimed that the coup was the result of an alliance between his longstanding enemy, the exiled right-wing nationalist Son Ngoc Thanh, the politician Prince Sisowath Sirik Matak (depicted by Sihanouk as a disgruntled rival claimant to the Cambodian throne) and the CIA, who wished to install a more US-friendly regime. There is in fact little if any evidence of CIA involvement in the coup, although it seems that sections of the US military establishment – notably the Army Special Forces – may have had some involvement in terms of offering support and training to the plotters after being approached by Lon Nol.

While Sihanouk was out of the country on a trip to France, anti-Vietnamese rioting took place in Phnom Penh, during which the North Vietnamese and NLF embassies were sacked. It seems likely that this rioting was at least tolerated, and possibly actively organised, by Lon Nol, the Prime Minister, and his deputy Prince Sirik Matak. On 12 March, the prime minister closed the port of Sihanoukville – through which weapons were being smuggled to the NLF – to the North Vietnamese and issued an impossible ultimatum to them. All PAVN/NLF forces were to withdraw from Cambodian soil within 72 hours (on 15 March) or face military action.

Despite these actions, which directly contradicted Sihanouk's policy of partial tolerance of North Vietnamese activity, it appears that Lon Nol himself had great personal reluctance to depose the Head of State: he initially may merely have wanted Sihanouk to apply more pressure to the North Vietnamese. He initially refused to commit to the plan; to convince him, Sirik Matak – who appears to have had a coup in mind from the start – played him a tape-recorded press conference from Paris, in which Sihanouk threatened to execute them both on his return to Phnom Penh. However, the Prime Minister remained uncertain, with the result that Sirik Matak, accompanied by three army officers, compelled a weeping Lon Nol to sign the necessary documents at gunpoint.

A vote was taken in the National Assembly on 18 March under the direction of In Tam, in which Sihanouk was stripped of his power: Lon Nol assumed the powers of the Head of State on an emergency basis. On 28 and 29 March there were large-scale popular demonstrations in favour of Sihanouk in several provincial cities, but Lon Nol's forces suppressed them with great brutality, causing several hundred deaths. Lon Nol's brother Lon Nil was among a number of government officials who were murdered by demonstrators.

Foreign regimes were initially uncertain as to the level of support to give to the new government. The North Vietnamese continued to hold talks with Lon Nol regarding the reinstatement of the cancelled trade agreement, though subsequent events meant that these were soon to come to an end.

Declaration of the Khmer Republic and the formation of FANK 
The most significant immediate effect of the coup was the Cambodian Campaign of April–July 1970, in which the South Vietnamese army (ARVN), backed by US troops, entered eastern Cambodia to attack North Vietnamese and Viet Cong forces operating there. Despite this assault, many of the communist forces escaped westward, deeper into Cambodia, or to the rural areas of the north-east, where they would provide support for the insurgency against Lon Nol.

Lon Nol's immediate reaction was to condemn the action as a violation of Cambodian territory. He later informed Alexander Haig that his country had been placed in serious danger as a result. When Haig told him that American ground forces would not be used to assist the Cambodian army, and that (in accordance with the Nixon Doctrine) a programme of aid would be given instead, Lon Nol openly wept.

On 9 October Sihanouk was condemned to death in absentia by a military court; his mother, Queen Kossamak – the symbolic representative of the monarchy under Sihanouk's regime – was placed under house arrest, and his wife Monique was sentenced to life imprisonment. The new regime simultaneously declared the Khmer Republic, and a new constitution was eventually to be adopted in 1972. Sihanouk, in the meantime, had formed GRUNK, a Beijing-based government-in-exile incorporating the communists and dedicated to the Republic's overthrow; he declared Lon Nol to be a "complete idiot" and characterised Sirik Matak as "nasty, perfidious, a lousy bastard".

The relatively small royal army, which at the time of the coup had around 35,000 troops (in accordance with Sihanouk's stated policy of neutrality), was greatly expanded. Reorganising as FANK, the republican army had grown to around 150,000 men as early as the end of 1970, mainly through voluntary enlistment as Lon Nol sought to capitalise on a wave of anti-Vietnamese sentiment. The US also implemented its programme of structured military aid and assistance in training, and flew in several thousand Khmer Serei and Khmer Kampuchea Krom militia, trained in South Vietnamese bases. The Joint Chiefs insisted on massive expansion of FANK to over 200,000 men, despite concerns at the severe negative effect this would have on Cambodia's economy, while the Military Equipment Delivery Team, led by General Theodore C. Mataxis, demanded the 'Americanisation' of the army's French-influenced internal structures, in spite of the chaos this caused in the supply chain.

Despite the US aid, FANK (commanded by General Sosthène Fernandez) was seriously handicapped by corruption, particularly by officers claiming salaries for non-existent troops, and military incompetence. Although one of the FANK commanders – the former rebel Prince Norodom Chantaraingsey, who was coaxed out of military retirement by Lon Nol to raise FANK's 13th Brigade – was to have considerable success in 'pacifying' the area around the strategic Highway 4 and the Kirirom Plateau, the majority of its generals had little military experience or ability. The large-scale FANK offensives against the Vietnamese, Operations Chenla I and II, ended in heavy defeat despite the conspicuous bravery of the individual Cambodian infantrymen.

As well as fighting the Cambodian Civil War against the pro-Sihanouk and communist insurgents and the North Vietnamese, the Khmer Republic faced considerable internal problems. Sihanouk's domination of political life during the 1950s and 60s meant that there were few confident or experienced Cambodian politicians. Almost from the start, the Republic was plagued by many of the same political divisions and infighting that had marked Sihanouk's regime; primary among these was a damaging power struggle between Lon Nol and Sirik Matak. Sirik Matak had been acting Prime Minister during the Republic's first year, when Lon Nol's health had been extremely poor, but had engendered considerable resentment due to his administrative style and royal connections; there was also growing frustration amongst young, urban Cambodians at the continued corruption and inefficiency of the regime.

On Lon Nol's return from hospital in Hawaii in April 1971, he instigated a cabinet crisis by resigning, providing a means to dissolve the government, with the probable encouragement of his brother Lon Non (a figure of considerable influence, especially with the military). After much political squabbling, a new cabinet was formed, though Sirik Matak continued as acting premier with the title of "Prime Minister-Delegate". On 16 October 1971, Lon Nol took action to strip the National Assembly of legislative power, and ordered it to write a new constitution, claiming that these actions were necessary to prevent anarchy; this provoked a protest by In Tam and 400 Buddhist monks.

1972: Removal of Sirik Matak
By 18 March 1972, Lon Nol and his brother had managed to drive Sirik Matak from power. After Sirik Matak had sacked Keo An, a dissident academic, Lon Non organised a series of vocal student demonstrations against him calling for his removal. Sirik Matak resigned, and (ostensibly for his 'protection') was placed under effective house arrest. Lon Nol used the crisis to oust the Head of State, Cheng Heng, and took over the role himself, appointing the veteran anti-Sihanouk nationalist Son Ngoc Thanh as Prime Minister. Thanh, leader of the Khmer Serei, had recruited FANK reinforcements amongst the Khmer Krom of southern Vietnam, and the loyalty he commanded amongst these comparatively elite, US-trained troops meant that his support for the Republic's fragile government remained essential.

Later that year, Lon Nol announced he would hold presidential elections, and was surprised when In Tam and Keo An – the latter a reputed Sihanoukist – not only announced that they would run, but then refused to withdraw. The elections, despite an inevitable victory for Lon Nol, revealed considerable dissatisfaction with the government even though they had been rigged in Lon Nol's favour: had they been fair, it is likely that In Tam would have won. The affair prompted In Tam to suggest that the Americans could now "stew in Lon Nol's juice".

The political situation continued to unravel throughout 1972: both opposition parties (In Tam's Democratic Party and Sirik Matak's Republican Party) refused to contest the elections to the National Assembly held in September, leading to a sweeping victory for Lon Non's Socio-Republican Party (Sangkum Sathéaranak Râth). There were a growing number of terrorist attacks in the capital, one of which was directed at Son Ngoc Thanh. Thanh – whose last political act was to ban Sirik Matak's newspaper – was then forced to resign, going back into South Vietnamese exile, and was replaced by the moderate leftist Hang Thun Hak.

While the Khmer Republic's government was being weakened by infighting, North Vietnamese forces – who had previously carried out much of the fighting against FANK, as in Operation Chenla I and II – gradually and deliberately scaled back their presence within Cambodian borders, leaving mainly logistical and support staff. Their place was taken by native Cambodian communist forces of the CPNLAF, which had been greatly increased when Sihanouk gave his support to the insurgency, rural Cambodians remaining overwhelmingly pro-Sihanouk.

1973: Ceasefire and the suspension of the National Assembly

The Paris Peace Accords of early 1973 seemed to offer a temporary respite from the civil war; Lon Nol declared a unilateral ceasefire, despite FANK's very weak position on the ground. There were in fact a few contacts between some of the more moderate elements of the Khmer Rouge communists – notably Hou Yuon – and the Republic. The North Vietnamese pressured the Cambodian communists to accept the terms of the peace accords; their interests lay more in keeping the war active at a low level (tying down South Vietnamese troops in the process) than in an outright victory for the Khmer Rouge. The Khmer Rouge leadership, however, remained intransigent.

The fighting resumed on the night of 7 February 1973, when communist forces attacked the FANK perimeter around the besieged city of Kampong Thom. By April, the Republic regime was in general disarray, with FANK troops refusing to fight and looting their own capital, and the CPNLAF advancing in many areas of the country. In response, the US finally threatened to cut off all aid unless Lon Nol acted to broaden the power base and support of the government – specifically, to reinstate the US ally Sirik Matak – and reduce the influence of his brother Lon Non.

Accordingly, on 24 April, Lon Nol announced that the National Assembly would be suspended, and that a Political Council formed of himself, Sirik Matak, Cheng Heng, and In Tam, would effectively rule by decree. The CPNLAF advance on Phnom Penh was eventually halted by American bombing, which caused horrific casualty levels amongst the communist troops. Some commentators state that the experience is likely to have contributed to the brutality shown by the Khmer Rouge cadres in later events.

1974: Fall of Oudong
By early 1974, the Political Council had been sidelined, and Lon Nol was once again ruling alone. The military situation, in the meantime, was deteriorating further. Communist forces came within shelling distance of Phnom Penh, and captured the former royal capital of Oudong in March: they 'evacuated' its population – shooting government officials and teachers – and destroyed or burnt much of the town. There was a brief improvement as the year progressed, however, as FANK retook Oudong, and was able to secure supply routes through Lake Tonlé Sap.

End of the regime
Despite this, the Khmer Republic did not survive the 1975 dry season offensive. The Khmer Rouge had by this point surrounded the capital, whose population had been vastly increased by refugees from the fighting; Lon Nol, who was extremely superstitious, ordered that consecrated sand be spread around the city from helicopters to protect it. Though FANK was by this time fighting with extreme tenacity, and the Khmer Rouge soldiers were suffering from poor morale, malaria, and even higher rates of casualties than FANK, fresh supplies of arms and ammunition from China gave them the impetus to overrun the Republic's remaining outposts.

Proposed peace negotiations repeatedly stalled as Sihanouk refused to deal with Lon Nol directly, requesting his removal as a precondition. A plan proposed by Étienne Manac'h, the French Ambassador to China, in which Sihanouk would return to Cambodia as the head of a national unity government (leading to the likely immediate defection of a large proportion of the Khmer Rouge's peasant soldiers), failed to materialise.

On 1 April 1975, Lon Nol resigned and fled the country into exile: FANK almost immediately disintegrated. While Sirik Matak, Long Boret, Lon Non and several other politicians remained in the capital in an attempt to negotiate a ceasefire, Phnom Penh fell to the Khmer Rouge on 17 April. Within a few days they had executed many representatives of the old regime, and the Khmer Republic had effectively come to an end. During its brief existence it had received almost exactly one million dollars of US military and economic aid a day.

The final area held by the Republic in any form was the Preah Vihear Temple in the Dângrêk Mountains, which FANK forces still occupied in late April 1975. It was finally taken by the Khmer Rouge on 22 May that year.

Armed forces

See also 
 Khmer National Armed Forces (FANK)
 Cambodian Civil War
 Khmer Republic at the 1972 Summer Olympics

Notes

References

External links 

 National anthem of the Khmer Republic
 Lon Nol- The Khmer Republic
 République Khmère 1970–1975 (07/15) 
 République Khmère 1970–1975 (15/15) 

 
Former countries in Cambodian history
Former polities of the Indochina Wars
Former republics
1970s in Cambodia
Cambodian Civil War
Republicanism in Cambodia
States and territories established in 1970
States and territories disestablished in 1975
1970 establishments in Cambodia
1975 disestablishments in Cambodia
20th century in Cambodia
Former countries in Southeast Asia
Military dictatorships